Cizeta Automobili SRL is a car manufacturer in the U.S. and one time headquartered in Modena, Italy, set up in the late 1980s by Claudio Zampolli, an Italian auto engineer, and Lamborghini driver, and the record producer Giorgio Moroder.

History
The name "Cizeta" comes from the Italian pronunciation of co-founder Claudio Zampolli's initials (C.Z.). Moroder became involved into the project when he took his Lamborghini Countach for a service at Zampolli's garage. Their only product, the Cizeta-Moroder V16T, featured a technically advanced transverse-configured sixteen-cylinder engine. Styled by Marcello Gandini, the body was strikingly similar to the later Lamborghini Diablo's as Gandini first proposed the design to the then Chrysler-owned Lamborghini, which altered the concept significantly. Gandini then brought the original Diablo design to Cizeta. The prototype was the only car to carry the "Cizeta-Moroder" badge, as Giorgio Moroder pulled out of the Cizeta project in 1990. The prototype remained with Giorgio Moroder for over thirty years, when, in early 2022, he sold it.

No production Cizeta was ever badged "Cizeta-Moroder" but merely "Cizeta V16T".  Only 8 cars were built before the shutdown of the firm in 1994.  Subsequently, 3 more cars were completed (two more coupe, and one spyder) in 1999 and 2003.

Refoundation
Mr. Zampolli moved to the US after the company went bankrupt in Italy and has set up a new company in California, called Cizeta Automobili USA.  He serviced exotic cars and continued to build (on demand) the Cizeta V16T.

On one instance a Cizeta was seized by the U.S. Immigration and Customs Enforcement on December 7, 2009.

Mr. Zampoli died on July 7, 2021 at age 82.

References

External links
Cizeta Automobili

Vehicle manufacturing companies established in 1988
Vehicle manufacturing companies disestablished in 1994
Sports car manufacturers